An engineering officer can be a Merchant Navy engineer or a commissioned officer with responsibility for military engineering, typically used in the British Armed Forces.

In the Royal Navy, Engineering Officers are responsible for the material condition of ships, submarines and naval aircraft.

In the Royal Air Force, Engineering Officers are responsible for weapons and aircraft systems and electronics communications systems.

Combat support occupations